On March 29, 1974 Mariner 10 became the first spacecraft to fly by Mercury, that saw a spacecraft for the first and last time in the 20th century.

Launches

|colspan=8|

January
|-

|colspan=8|

February
|-

|colspan=8|

March
|-

|colspan=8|

April
|-

|colspan=8|

May
|-

|colspan=8|

June
|-

|colspan=8|

July
|-

|colspan=8|

August
|-

|colspan=8|

September
|-

|colspan=8|

October
|-

|colspan=8|

November
|-

|colspan=8|

December
|-

Deep Space Rendezvous

EVAs

References

Footnotes

 
Spaceflight by year